Nicolaas Adrianus Rupke (born 22 January 1944 in Rotterdam) is a Dutch historian of science, who began his academic career as a marine geologist.

He studied biology and geology at the university of Groningen and geology and the history of science at Princeton and Oxford. Early in his studies, Rupke was a Christian and proponent of Flood geology, but later came to reject this position. When in 1977 he was elected to a Wolfson College, Oxford research position in the history of science, Rupke made this subject his full-time occupation. A series of similar international research posts followed, until in 1993 he took up a professorship at Göttingen University to teach the history of science and medicine. In 2009, Rupke was awarded a Lower Saxony research chair. In 2012, he took up an endowed professorship at Washington and Lee University in Lexington, Virginia, USA.

Rupke is known for his studies of late-modern biology, geology and science & religion. With an interest in the biographical approach, he restored to their contemporary prominence several nineteenth-century scientists, most important among them Richard Owen who well before the appearance of The Origin of Species developed a naturalistic theory of evolution, albeit a non-Darwinian one.

Studies of Alexander von Humboldt came next, in which Rupke developed what he terms the metabiographical approach by exploring how a famous life – in this case Humboldt's – may be multiply retold and reconstructed as part of different belief systems and memory cultures.

Rupke is a fellow of Germany's National Academy of Sciences Leopoldina and of the Göttingen Academy of Sciences.

Selected books
 Distinctive Properties of Turbiditic and Hemipelagic Mud Layers (with Daniel J. Stanley). Washington, DC: Smithsonian Institution Press, 1974.
The Great Chain of History: William Buckland and the English School of Geology (1814–1849). Oxford: Clarendon Press, 1983. 
Vivisection in Historical Perspective (ed.). London, Croom Helm, 1987; Routledge, 1988. 
Science, Politics and the Public Good (ed.). London: Macmillan, 1988.
Medical Geography in Historical Perspective (ed.). London: Wellcome Trust Centre for the History of Medicine, 2000. 
Richard Owen: Biology without Darwin (revised ed. of Richard Owen: Victorian Naturalist, New Haven and London: Yale, 1994) Chicago and London: University of Chicago Press, 2009.
Alexander von Humboldt: A Metabiography (corrected edition). Chicago and London: University of Chicago Press, 2008. 
Eminent Lives in Twentieth-Century Science and Religion (ed.) (revised and much expanded edition). Frankurt a.M.: Lang, 2009. 
Albrecht von Haller im Göttingen der Aufklärung (ed. with ). Göttingen: Wallstein, 2009.

References

External links
 Academic homepage.
 Faculty listing, Göttingen University.

1944 births
Living people
Academic staff of the University of Göttingen
20th-century Dutch geologists
Historians of science
Princeton University alumni
Alumni of Wolfson College, Oxford
Writers from Rotterdam
21st-century Dutch geologists